St Leonards is a suburb of the New Zealand city of Dunedin. It is located close to the northern shore of the Otago Harbour and on the hilly slopes above the harbour. St Leonards was named by early settler David Carey for the birthplace of his wife, the English town of St Leonards-on-Sea, on the Sussex coast.

Rail and road links between central Dunedin and Port Chalmers run alongside St Leonards on the narrow strip of land between the hill slopes and harbour. The suburb is separate from the contiguous urban area of Dunedin. 

The suburb is residential, and contains a significant number of smaller homes. The area is a popular residence for students from the University of Otago, and is also popular with alternative lifestylers. The suburb consists mainly of two roughly parallel roads, the Dunedin-Port Chalmers highway (State Highway 88), which runs close to the harbour, and St Leonards Drive, the former main route to Port Chalmers, which winds around the lower slopes of the hills on which St Leonards sits. The Port Chalmers Branch railway line runs parallel with the highway next to the harbour's edge. In 2012, the Dunedin Harbour Cycleway was extended to reach St Leonards.

The suburbs of St Leonards, Maia, Burkes, and Ravensbourne, are often collectively referred to as West Harbour. Under this name, the area was a separate borough for many years from 1877 until amalgamation with the city of Dunedin in 1963.

Demographics

St Leonards and Burkes, which cover , are part of the Ravensbourne-St Leonards statistical area. They had a population of 669 at the 2018 New Zealand census, a decrease of 3 people (-0.4%) since the 2013 census, and an increase of 33 people (5.2%) since the 2006 census. There were 261 households. There were 315 males and 354 females, giving a sex ratio of 0.89 males per female, with 102 people (15.2%) aged under 15 years, 96 (14.3%) aged 15 to 29, 363 (54.3%) aged 30 to 64, and 117 (17.5%) aged 65 or older.

Ethnicities were 93.7% European, 6.7% Māori, 1.3% Pacific peoples, 3.1% Asian, and 2.7% other ethnicities (totals add to more than 100% since people could identify with multiple ethnicities).

Although some people objected to giving their religion, 60.5% had no religion, 28.7% were Christian, 0.9% were Hindu, 0.4% were Muslim, 0.4% were Buddhist and 4.0% had other religions.

Of those at least 15 years old, 225 (39.7%) people had a bachelor or higher degree, and 57 (10.1%) people had no formal qualifications. The employment status of those at least 15 was that 300 (52.9%) people were employed full-time, 102 (18.0%) were part-time, and 12 (2.1%) were unemployed.

Education
St Leonards School is a state contributing primary school serving years 1 to 6 with a roll of  students as of  The school was founded in 1868 as Upper Harbour West School, and was expanded and renamed in 1874.

References

Saint Leonards